Calon (Welsh for 'heart') is the trading name of Mount Stuart Media Ltd., a British animation television production company based in Cardiff, the capital of Wales, which primarily produced animation series in Welsh for S4C. The company was formerly known as Siriol Animation and Siriol Productions.

History 
Calon was set up following the management buy-out from Entertainment Rights of Siriol Productions, when Entertainment Rights moved its head office to London. Most members of staff stayed in Wales to help re-establish Siriol as an independent production company. The deal included all rights to current productions and a few older titles, but the rights to most of the older series are now held by Entertainment Rights.

The company eventually employed over 40 people and was a developer of talent in the Welsh animation industry for more than 30 years. Calon continued working on animation production, but expanded into live-action content for both the UK and international markets, and to co-produce with major networks outside the UK.

In July 2010, the company filed for voluntary liquidation when hoped-for investment to expand the company failed to materialise.
Shortly afterwards it was Incorporated into Mount Stuart Media Ltd.

Productions
Two series of Hana's Helpline were produced for Five's Milkshake block for preschool children in co-production with S4C and German broadcaster ZDF. One series of Igam Ogam was made for S4C, Five, ZDF Enterprises and the Gaelic Media Service on BBC Alba, and also a puppet series called The Zoo Factor for CBBC. Calon's live action drama credits included Help! I'm a Teenage Outlaw for ITV and Nickelodeon. In 2011, ITV asked Calon to create a new sitcom for the channel, and Calon worked with The Osmonds on develop a film based around the wild west.

Help! I'm a Teenage Outlaw (adventure game show)
Bobinogs (season 3)
Hana's Helpline
Psi-5 (pilot film; 2007)
U-Chronia (pilot film; 2009)
Igam Ogam (2009-2013)
The Zoo Factor (2011)
Captain Morten and the Spider Queen (2018) (film)
Sali Mali (December 2020 – present) (season 2)

Hana's Helpline
Hana's Helpline is a stop-motion animation series for preschool children, about Hana, a duck who runs a telephone helpline for animals with problems. The principal voices are provided by Arabella Weir, Jonathan Kydd, Joanna Ruiz, Boyd Clack and Caroline Harker with most of the other voices being provided by children.

There are 52 episodes, each 10 minutes long. Its first broadcast was in Wales under the Welsh title Holi Hana, on 2 April 2007. Its first English broadcast was on Five on 12 June 2007. It has also been broadcast in a selection of other countries - for example it began broadcasting on TVB Pearl, starting 10 May 2007. Books are available from Random House Children's Books from January 2008. A line of character toys was also developed by Golden Bear Toys along with the first DVD of the show which was released in November 2007. A second compilation was released in Spring 2008.

Siriol Productions

Siriol Productions (also known as Dave Edwards Studio, "Siriol" means 'cheerful' in Welsh language) was founded in 1982 by Mike Young, his wife Liz, animator Dave Edwards and producer Robin Lyons and based in Cardiff. The company was originally created when the three men approached the newly formed Welsh TV channel S4C and secured a commission to produce an animated series of SuperTed (which Mike Young created). With support from S4C, the partners set up an animation studio, Siriol Animation. SuperTed was a highly successful with the company winning a prestigious BAFTA award in 1987. The show first aired in 1982 and started airing on S4C in Wales and on the BBC elsewhere in the UK. It also ran for one season and 37 episodes.

Following its success with SuperTed, the company was commissioned by S4C to produce another series called Wil Cwac Cwac which was based on a series of children's books that were first published in Wales in the early 1930s about a little duckling who is always naughty and lives in a farm village with his family and friends. This, in turn was followed by further commissions from S4C for half-hour specials created for the animated series Fox Tales. Lyons and Young have also been involved in working on a children's stop motion animated series, Fireman Sam in 1987, except it was produced by Prism Art and Design Ltd and Bumper Films. In its early years, the studio worked exclusively for S4C, and Robin Lyons (Managing Director) decided to broaden its customer base and to move into co-productions to form Siriol Productions in 1988. In 1989, Mike Young left the company and moved to the United States to set up his own company, Mike Young Productions. Young also teamed up with Hanna-Barbera to develop a cartoon called Fantastic Max (which was originally called Space Baby) and to create a sequel series to SuperTed entitled The Further Adventures of SuperTed.

Moving into co-productions has proved successful for Siriol, resulting in productions such as The Princess and the Goblin an 80-minute film co-produced by Hungary's Pannonia Film Studio and Under Milk Wood, a 50-minute TV special using the 1950s voice recording by Richard Burton. These productions have enabled Robin Lyons to develop extensive contacts throughout the animation industry, both with broadcasters such as the BBC and ITV, and with other leading animation studios.

In 1989, Siriol, together with three other animation studios in France, Germany and Belgium formed its own distribution company, EVA Entertainment, headed up by Steve Walsh, the former head of co-productions at Goldcrest Films. Its co-productions were grouped under the EC's CARTOON programme as part of its MEDIA initiative. EVA was the first grouping company established under this initiative. The group set up co-productions with major European broadcasters, typically with the BBC in the UK, FR3 and Canal+ in France and ZDF and WDR in Germany. It also made co-productions with other European partners as well as with US and Canadian co-producers.

In 1995, EVA received a substantial private investment and attracted two top executives from BBC Children's International, Mikael Shields and Tony Stern. EVA Entertainment has made many series and specials, (the group's major productions were controlled creatively by Siriol) which were sold to over fifty different countries on five continents, including Robert Creep, Tales of the Tooth Fairies, Billy the Cat (the group's largest project) and Romuald the Reindeer. The later two programmes were produced by Robin Lyons. When EVA was sold to Pearson PLC, Siriol formed other alliances with Scottish Television and SKD Media Plc.

In 1998, Siriol was brought over by Sleepy Kids (renamed Entertainment Rights in 2000), with Lyons expanding his role within the new company. In 2005, a management buyout led by Lyons took place for Siriol Productions, and was renamed Calon.

Siriol set up two subdivisions. The first was Blunt Pictures, which produced animation aimed at older audiences. Blunt Pictures has produced a short film for Channel 4, Dee’s Dish of the Day and developed the series, Stonehouse Reunion for Channel 4 and Days of Deliverance for S4C. Blunt has also developed a low budget feature, 360, which has attracted funding from the Film Panel of the Welsh Lottery, and several web-based animation projects including Once Upon A Morgue and Deadenders. The second subdivision was a web design subdivision called Piczled, which has designed the official Basil Brush website and theme park attractions for Chessington World of Adventures in Surrey and Alton Towers in Staffordshire. Piczled has also worked on other websites such as those for Siriol and Entertainment Rights.

Production

SuperTed (1982–1986, TV series, co-produced with S4C and BBC)
Wil Cwac Cwac (1982–1986, TV series, co-produced with S4C)
Fox Tales (1986–1988, TV specials, co-produced with S4C and Channel 4)
A Winter Story (1986)
The Easter Egg (1987)
Turkey Love (1988)
Space Baby (1988, half-hour pilot, later became Fantastic Max, 1988–1990, co-produced with Hanna-Barbera)
The Further Adventures of SuperTed (1989, TV series, co-produced with Hanna-Barbera)
Santa and the Tooth Fairies (1991, TV special, co-produced with La Fabrique, Cologne Cartoon, Sofidoc SA, EVA Entertainment and BBC)
The Princess and the Goblin (1992, film, co-produced with Pannonia Film Studio, S4C and NHK)
Santa’s First Christmas (1992, TV special, co-produced with EVA Entertainment, Cologne Cartoon, S4C, and Filmstiftung Nordrhein-Westfalen)
Under Milk Wood (1992, film, co-produced with S4C: Distributed theatrically in over 25 countries, including USA; won a 1992 BAFTA Cymru award)
Tales of the Tooth Fairies (1992, TV series, co-produced with La Fabrique, EVA Entertainment, Cologne Cartoon, Sofidoc S.A., WDR, France 3, and BBC)
Gerald of Wales (1993, TV special, co-produced with Cadw and S4C)
The Legand Of Lochnager (1993, co-produced with S4C, BBC Scotland and BBC Wales)
Robert Creep (1994, TV series, co-produced with EVA Entertainment: Best Special Award at the 1994 Treviso Festival)
The Hot Rod Dogs and Cool Car Cats (1995-1996, TV Series, co-produced with Mike Young Productions and Scottish Television)
Romuald the Reindeer (1996, TV series, co-produced with EVA Entertainment and La Fabrique)
Billy the Cat (1996, TV series, co-produced with Les Films du Triangle, NOA, Western International Communications, Sofidoc SA, ZDF, FR3, Cologne Cartoon, La Fabrique and EVA Entertainment)
The Blobs (1997–1998, TV series, co-produced with Taytel and Scottish Television Enterprises)
Hilltop Hospital (1999–2002, TV series, co-produced with EVA Entertainment, Canal J, FR3, ZDF, Millimages and Folimage: Has awards in Italy, France and the USA. The show was nominated for a BAFTA in 2001)
Meeow! (2000, TV series, co-produced with SKD Media Plc, Comataidh Craolaidh Gaidhlig and Scottish Television)
Sali Mali (2000, TV series, co-produced with Cymdeithas Lyfrau Ceredigion and S4C)
Drums of Noto Hanto (2000, 15-minute short, co-produced with S4C)
Knife and Wife (2001, TV special, co-produced with Channel 4)

Animation services

S4C network ID (1987)
Knightmare (1987) (opening animation)
MTV network ID (1988)
Babar (1989) (season 1 for Nelvana)
Body Beautiful (1991)
Lava Lava (for La Fabrique)
Hurricanes (1993, Series 1, for DIC Entertainment L.P. and Scottish Television Enterprises)
Soul Music (1997) (for Cosgrove Hall Films)
Toons from Planet Orange (1998) ("Helmutt and the Killer Nose" for Cologne Cartoon)
Lucky and Zorba (1998) (for Lanterna Magica)
A Monkey's Tale (1999)
Albie (2002, 2004) (for Cosgrove Hall Films)
Bounty Hamster (2003)
Totò Sapore e la magica storia della pizza (2003) (for Lanterna Magica)
BB3B (2004)
Dragon Tales (2005) (for Sesame Workshop)
Fireman Sam (2005) (for HIT Entertainment)

Knife and Wife
Knife and Wife was a British one-off half-hour animated Comedy programme screened on Channel 4 in December 2001. It was created by Blunt Films, the adult animation division of Siriol and written by Paul Rose.

The voice of Knife was provided by former Monty Python member Terry Jones, whilst the part of his wife, Janine was voiced by actress Jessica Stevenson. Kevin Eldon, Ruth Jones, Paul Putner and Brian Murphy also did voices for the series. The programme was part of the Channel 4 Comedy Lab try-out project, which had spawned several successful series including Trigger Happy TV and That Peter Kay Thing. No full series followed.

Kalisto Ltd
Kalisto Ltd. is a short lived co-venture between the directors of Siriol Animation and Booker Group. Launched in 1986, the company has developed a show called Space Baby (which eventually became Fantastic Max, which was co-produced with Hanna-Barbera), along with another series called Satellite City (co-produced with Fairwater Films) and the 1991 animated film adaptation of the children's book The Little Engine That Could. Kalisto barely lasted a year before Booker bought the rights back.

References

Sources
Radio Times Guide to TV Comedy 2003. Edited by Mark Lewisohn. BBC Worldwide 2003.

External links

Television production companies of the United Kingdom
British animation studios
Companies based in Cardiff
Mass media companies established in 1981
1981 establishments in Wales
CBeebies